Navajo Family Sign is a sign language used by a small deaf community of the Navajo People.

References

Navajo Nation
Sign languages
Sign languages of the United States